The Abu Dhabi Music & Arts Foundation is a not-for-profit organisation based in Abu Dhabi, It was established by Hoda Al Khamis Kanoo in 1996.

Abu Dhabi Festival 
ADMAF organizes the annual Abu Dhabi Festival.

See also
 Culture of the United Arab Emirates

References 

Organisations based in Abu Dhabi